Cornelia "Conny" van Bentum (born 12 August 1965, in Barneveld) is a former butterfly and freestyle swimmer from the Netherlands.

Swimming career
Van Bentum competed in three consecutive Summer Olympics for her native country, starting in 1980. At each of those swimming tournaments she won a medal with the 4×100 m freestyle relay team: one bronze (1980), and two silvers (1984 and 1988).

In 1988 she won the 'Open' ASA National British Championships over 50 metres freestyle, 100 metres freestyle and 200 metres freestyle. She also won the 100 metres butterfly and the 200 metres butterfly titles in 1988.

References

External links
 Dutch Olympic Committee

1965 births
Living people
People from Barneveld
Sportspeople from Gelderland
Olympic swimmers of the Netherlands
Dutch female butterfly swimmers
Swimmers at the 1980 Summer Olympics
Swimmers at the 1984 Summer Olympics
Swimmers at the 1988 Summer Olympics
Olympic silver medalists for the Netherlands
Olympic bronze medalists for the Netherlands
Olympic bronze medalists in swimming
Medalists at the 1980 Summer Olympics
Medalists at the 1984 Summer Olympics
Medalists at the 1988 Summer Olympics
Dutch female freestyle swimmers
World Aquatics Championships medalists in swimming
European Aquatics Championships medalists in swimming
Olympic silver medalists in swimming
Universiade medalists in swimming
Universiade gold medalists for the Netherlands
Universiade silver medalists for the Netherlands
Universiade bronze medalists for the Netherlands
Medalists at the 1985 Summer Universiade
Medalists at the 1987 Summer Universiade